This is a list of schools in Newcastle upon Tyne in Tyne and Wear, England.

State-funded schools

Primary and first schools

Archbishop Runcie CE First School
Archibald First School
Atkinson Road Primary Academy
Beech Hill Primary School
Benton Park Primary School
Bridgewater Primary School
Broadway East First School
Broadwood Primary School
Brunton First School
Byker Primary School
Canning Street Primary School
Central Walker CE Primary School
Cheviot Primary School
Chillingham Road Primary School
Christ Church CE Primary School
Cragside Primary School
Dinnington First School
English Martyrs RC Primary School
Excelsior Academy
Farne Primary School
Grange First School
Hawthorn Primary School
Hilton Primary Academy
Hotspur Primary School
Kenton Bar Primary School 
Kingston Park Primary School
Knop Law Primary School
Lemington Riversde Primary School
Milecastle Primary School
Moorside Primary School
Mountfield Primary School
Newburn Manor Primary School
North Fawdon Primary School
Our Lady and St Anne's RC Primary School
Ravenswood Primary School
Regent Farm First School
Sacred Heart RC Primary School 
St Alban's RC Primary School 
St Bede's RC Primary School
St Catherine's RC Primary School
St Charles' RC Primary School
St Cuthbert's RC Primary School, Kenton)
St Cuthbert's RC Primary School, Walbottle
St George's RC Primary School
St John Vianney RC Primary School
St John's Primary School 
St Joseph's RC Primary School
St Lawrence's RC Primary School
St Mark's RC Primary School
St Michael's RC Primary School
St Oswald's RC Primary School
St Paul's CE Primary School
St Teresa's RC primary school
St Vincent's RC Primary School
Simonside Primary School
South Gosforth First School
Stocksfield Avenue Primary School
Thomas Walling Primary Academy
Throckley Primary School
Tyneview Primary School
Walbottle Village Primary School
Walkergate Community School
Waverley Primary School
Welbeck Academy
West Denton Primary School
West Jesmond Primary School
West Newcastle Academy
West Walker Primary School
Westerhope Primary School
Westgate Hill Primary Academy
Wingrove Primary School
Wyndham Primary School

Middle schools
Gosforth Central Middle School
Gosforth East Middle School
Gosforth Junior High Academy

Secondary and upper schools 

Benfield School
Callerton Academy
Excelsior Academy
Gosforth Academy
Great Park Academy
Jesmond Park Academy
Kenton School
North East Futures UTC
Sacred Heart RC High School
St Cuthbert's RC High School
St Mary's RC School
Studio West
Walbottle Academy
Walker Riverside Academy

Special and alternative schools
Hadrian School
Mary Astell Academy
Newcastle Bridges School
Sir Charles Parsons School
Thomas Bewick School
Trinity Academy Newcastle

Further education
 Newcastle College
 Newcastle Sixth Form College

Independent schools

Primary and preparatory schools
Newcastle Preparatory School

Senior and all-through schools
Bahr Academy
Dame Allan's School
Newcastle High School for Girls
Newcastle School for Boys
Royal Grammar School
Westfield School

Special and alternative schools
Northern Counties School
Talbot House School

Newcastle upon Tyne
Schools in Newcastle upon Tyne
Schools
Lists of buildings and structures in Tyne and Wear